Mill Road may be:

In Europe
 Mill Road, Cambridge, England
 Mill Road, Isle of Man

In North America
 Mill Road, Eastchester, New York, USA
 Mill Road, Freeport, New York, USA
 Mill Road, Staten Island, New York, USA
 Old Mill Road, Staten Island, New York, USA
 Mill Road, Toronto, Ontario, Canada
 Mill Road, Edmonton, Alberta, Canada

in New Zealand 
 mill road , Invercargill in South Îsland

See also
 Mill Lane (disambiguation)
 Mill Street (disambiguation)

Odonyms referring to a building